Purbach am Neusiedlersee,  which is sometimes written as Purbach am Neusiedler See or Purbach am See, is a town in the Austrian state of Burgenland known for its viticulture.  It lies in the Eisenstadt-Umgebung district.

Purbach is located at the western shores of Neusiedler See, the only steppe lake in Central Europe, and the only lake without natural outflow in Europe.

Names
Purbach am Neusiedlersee, literally Purbach on Lake Neusiedl, is often referred to solely as Purbach. It was Feketeváros, Sopron, Hungary prior to the breakup of the Austro-Hungarian Empire.

It was known as Porpuh in Croatian.

History
Settlement in Purbach can be traced to the 6th century BCE.

During Roman times, it lay on the famous amber trade route.

The first documented mention of the town occurred in 1270.

In 1918, the city changed from Feketeváros, Sopron, Hungary to present day Purbach am Neusiedlersee, Burgenland, Austria.

Population

References

External links
 — official website (in German)
 Midsummer Festival at Lake Neusiedl — Celebrating the longest day of the year...
 — Burgenland info
nona.net — region maps of Purbach am Neusiedlersee
 tiscover.at — tourism information

Cities and towns in Eisenstadt-Umgebung District
Wine regions of Austria